Caenis hilaris is a species of small squaregilled mayfly in the family Caenidae. It is found in North America.

References

Mayflies
Articles created by Qbugbot
Insects described in 1839